Île Madame is an island in the Charente estuary on the Atlantic coast of France joined to the mainland by a causeway. The island has an area of four square miles and is unpopulated. It is part of the town Port-des-Barques.

Hundreds of Catholic priests were held prisoner on the island during anti-clerical persecution in 1794. A total of 254 died before the survivors were allowed to leave.

The priests who were held prisoner and those who died on the island are commemorated during a pilgrimage there each August.

External links
Article by Jonathan Luxmoore for Catholic News Service

Madame
River islands of France